Protolestes is a genus of flatwings in the damselfly order Odonata. There are about eight described species in Protolestes.

As a result of molecular phylogenetic studies by Bybee et al. in 2021, it is now in its own family, Protolestidae.

Species
 Protolestes fickei Förster, 1899
 Protolestes furcatus Aguesse, 1967
 Protolestes kerckhoffae Schmidt, 1949
 Protolestes leonorae Schmidt, 1949
 Protolestes milloti Fraser, 1949
 Protolestes proselytus Lieftinck, 1965
 Protolestes rufescens Aguesse, 1967
 Protolestes simonei Aguesse, 1967

References

Calopterygoidea
Zygoptera genera